"Ovule" is a song by Icelandic musician Björk, released on 14 September 2022 as the second single from her tenth studio album Fossora. The song was written and produced by Björk, who also arranged the trombones and timpani.

Background 
Björk announced the song's release date on her social media on 14 September 2022, describing it as "a meditation about us as lovers walking around this world." Featuring trombone played by Bergur Þórisson and timpani by Soraya Nayyar (with both parts arranged by Björk), the track contains elements of jazz and reggaeton. The track also features percussion from Reykjavík trio Sideproject who were instructed to "channel the lurid sounds of Star Wars Mos Eisley cantina band."

Music video
The music video was also released on 14 September 2022, and was directed by Nick Knight, whom Björk worked with on her "Pagan Poetry" video in 2001 and Homogenic album cover in 1997.

Track listings 
Digital download

 Ovule – 3:38

Digital download - Sega Bodega Remix
 Ovule (Sega Bodega Remix) [with Shygirl] – 3:44

Personnel
Credits taken from Fossora's official website:
Björk – vocals, production, beat, arrangements
Soraya Nayyar – timpani
Bergur Þorrison – trombone
Sideproject – percussion

Notes

References

2022 singles
2022 songs
Björk songs
Song recordings produced by Björk
Songs written by Björk